Puppet on a String may refer to:

 Puppet on a String (album), by Sandie Shaw, 1967
 "Puppet on a String" (Sandie Shaw song)
 "Puppet on a String" (Elvis Presley song), 1965
 "Puppet on a String" (Jo Jo Zep & The Falcons song), 1980